The 1941 Boston Braves season was the 71st season of the franchise, and saw the team revert to the “Braves” moniker after five seasons playing under the name of “Boston Bees”. The Braves finished seventh in the National League with a record of 62 wins and 92 losses.

Regular season

Season standings

Record vs. opponents

Notable transactions 
 September 20, 1941: Nanny Fernandez was purchased by the Braves from the San Francisco Seals.

Roster

Player stats

Batting

Starters by position 
Note: Pos = Position; G = Games played; AB = At bats; H = Hits; Avg. = Batting average; HR = Home runs; RBI = Runs batted in

Other batters 
Note: G = Games played; AB = At bats; H = Hits; Avg. = Batting average; HR = Home runs; RBI = Runs batted in

Pitching

Starting pitchers 
Note: G = Games pitched; IP = Innings pitched; W = Wins; L = Losses; ERA = Earned run average; SO = Strikeouts

Other pitchers 
Note: G = Games pitched; IP = Innings pitched; W = Wins; L = Losses; ERA = Earned run average; SO = Strikeouts

Relief pitchers 
Note: G = Games pitched; W = Wins; L = Losses; SV = Saves; ERA = Earned run average; SO = Strikeouts

Farm system 

LEAGUE CHAMPIONS: Bradford

Notes

References 
1941 Boston Braves season at Baseball Reference

Boston Braves seasons
Boston Braves
Boston Braves
1940s in Boston